Vadim Bavikin (born 4 October 1970) is a USSR-born Israeli javelin thrower.

He was originally a Soviet citizen, and went to a boarding school for talented athletes there.  He emigrated to Israel in 1990.

He finished tenth for Israel at the 1991 World Championships in Tokyo. He later competed at the World Championships in 1993, 2001, 2003 and 2005. He competed as well for Israel at the 1992 Olympics  in Barcelona without reaching the final round.

In 1994, Bavikin tested positive for steroids in a blood test. He was banned for almost four years.

His personal best throw is 81.94 metres, achieved in June 2004 in Zaragoza, Spain. This is the Israeli record.

Achievements

Seasonal bests by year
1988 - 63.80
1989 - 69.70
1990 - 70.80
1991 - 81.56
1992 - 77.30
1993 - 78.48
1994 - 67.16
1998 - 76.45
1999 - 76.80
2000 - 80.48
2001 - 80.54
2002 - 81.68
2003 - 80.95
2004 - 81.94
2005 - 77.57
2006 - 77.13
2007 - 73.51

IAAF controversy 
Vadim Bavikin emigrated to Israel in 1990. International Amateur Athletic Federation (IAAF) requires an emigrating citizen to live for three years in a new country before competing. However, the president of the Soviet track and field federation, Igor Ter-Ovanesyan, signed an agreement that allowed recent Soviet emigres to Israel to compete after just one year of residence.

The agreement enabled Israel to add three athletes — Igor Avrunin in the shot-put and discus, Vadim Bavikin in the javelin and Vladimir Ostrovskiy in the 20-kilometer walk  — to its team of Rogel Nachum (men's triple jump) and Orit Kolodni (women's 200 and 400 meters).

Thanks to this agreement Vadim Bavikin was able to participate at the 1991 World Championship in Tokyo and the 1992 Olympics in Barcelona.

See also
List of Israeli records in athletics
List of Maccabiah records in athletics

References

External links
 

1970 births
Living people
Israeli male javelin throwers
Athletes (track and field) at the 1992 Summer Olympics
Olympic athletes of Israel
Doping cases in athletics
Israeli sportspeople in doping cases
Ukrainian Jews
Soviet emigrants to Israel